Writing is a medium of human communication that represents language and emotion through the inscription or recording of signs and symbols.

Writing may also refer to:
 The work of an author
Communication
Musical composition
Screenwriting
Writing: The Story of Alphabets and Scripts, a 1987 illustrated book by Georges Jean

Write
write (system call), a system call that implements low-level file writing operations
write (Unix), a Unix shell command that allows the user to send messages to other users
Write, to treat or alter digital data during input/output
pfs:Write, an early word processor for IBMzz PCs of the late 1980s
Windows Write, the early Microsoft Windows word processor